Cabo Velas Airport  is an airport serving the Pacific coastal villages along the Playa Grande, north of Tamarindo in Guanacaste Province, Costa Rica.

There are hills west and northeast of the airport. South approach and departure are over the water. There is an additional  unpaved overrun on the south end of the runway.

See also

Transport in Costa Rica
List of airports in Costa Rica

References

External links
 OurAirports - Cabo Velas Airport
 OpenStreetMap - Cabo Velas
 HERE/Nokia - Cabo Velas
 FallingRain - Cabo Velas Airport
 

Airports in Costa Rica
Guanacaste Province